Charles Jochums (born 1 May 1957) is a former Belgian racing cyclist. He rode in the 1980 Tour de France.

References

External links

1957 births
Living people
Belgian male cyclists
Cyclists from Antwerp